Reg Saner (born 1928, died 2021, Jacksonville, Illinois) was an American poet and professor.

Life
He graduated from St. Norbert College, near Green Bay, Wisconsin.

He served as an infantry platoon leader in the Korean War.

He studied at University of Illinois, an received a Fulbright Scholarship to study at University of Florence.

In the early 1960s he married Anne.

From September 1962, to December 1998, he taught at the University of Colorado at Boulder.

Until his death in 2021 [4] lived in Boulder, Colorado.

Awards
 1975 Walt Whitman Award
 1981 National Poetry Series open competition
 1983 Governor’s Award for Excellence in the Arts
 1998 Wallace Stegner award
 1999 Boulder, Colorado city's first poet laureate

Works

Poetry
 
 
 
 Red Letters (1981)

Non-fiction
  
  (Kodansha paperback, 1994)
 Reaching Keet Seel: Ruin’s Echo & the Anasazi (University Press of Utah, 1998)
 The Dawn Collector: On My Way to the Natural World Center for American Places 2005

Anthologies
 
 Short Takes (Norton, 2005)
 Old Glory: American War Poems from the Revolutionary War to the War on Terrorism (Persea, 2004)
 Poetry Comes Up Where It Can (University of Utah Press, 2000)
 Orpheus & Company (University Press of New England, 1999)

References

Further reading
   (print and on-line)

1931 births
Living people
American male poets
St. Norbert College alumni
University of Illinois alumni
University of Florence alumni
University of Colorado Boulder faculty
Municipal Poets Laureate in the United States